Will Reiser is an American screenwriter and producer. He is best known for writing the 2011 film 50/50, which was based on his own experience with cancer.

Early life
He is the cousin of actor and comedian Paul Reiser.

Reiser attended Hampshire College in Amherst, Massachusetts, graduating in 2003.

Career
Reiser first worked as a producer in a number of TV productions, such as Da Ali G Show. In 2005, during his time working as an associate producer, he was diagnosed with a form of spinal cancer at the age of 25. After he underwent surgery, he was urged by Seth Rogen and Evan Goldberg, who also worked on Da Ali G Show, to write a screenplay based on his experiences. In 2008 Reiser completed his first draft of 50/50, his first screenplay. With Rogen and Goldberg producing the film, the script was bought by Mandate Pictures with Rogen also attached to star in the film as the best friend of the protagonist, Adam (played by Joseph Gordon-Levitt), and the film was released in September 2011. At the time of the film's release, Reiser had been cancer-free for six years. He won numerous awards for 50/50, including the Independent Spirit Award for Best First Screenplay and the National Board of Review of Motion Pictures award for Best Original Screenplay. He was also honored at the 2012 Annual OMG! Cancer Summit for Young Adults for his "courage, irreverence and creativity in achieving meaningful and impactful change on behalf of the young adult cancer survivorship movement".

In September 2011 it was reported that Reiser was working on an American version of the German comedy film Men... That same month it was also reported that Reiser was working on a film titled Jamaica, based on a vacation he took to Jamaica with his grandma at the age of 14. Jonathan Levine, who directed 50/50, was attached to direct the film.

Filmography

Film

TV

References

External links

American male screenwriters
Living people
American television producers
Place of birth missing (living people)
Year of birth missing (living people)